Ragnar Gustavsson (born 28 September 1907) was a Swedish football forward who played for Sweden in the 1934 FIFA World Cup. He also played for GAIS.

References

External links

1907 births
Swedish footballers
Sweden international footballers
Association football forwards
GAIS players
Allsvenskan players
1934 FIFA World Cup players
1980 deaths